Holubice is a municipality and village in Prague-West District in the Central Bohemian Region of the Czech Republic. It has about 2,100 inhabitants.

Administrative parts
The village of Kozinec is an administrative part of Holubice.

Paleontology
In 1878 a few fossil fragments of some small Cretaceous reptile (presumably a small dinosaur of uncertain affinities) were found here. Czech naturalist Antonín Frič named it Procerosaurus exogyrarum, now it is known as Ponerosteus exogyrarum.

References

Villages in Prague-West District